Alparslan, or also Alpaslan, "heroic lion" in Turkish,  may refer to:

Given name
 Alp Arslan, Turkic ruler
 Alparslan Arslan, Turkish criminal
 Alparslan Çelik, Turkish extremist
 Alparslan Erdem, Turkish-German footballer 
 Alparslan Türkeş, Turkish nationalist politician

Surnames
 Ayşenur Alpaslan (born 1953), Turkish woman diplomat and former ambassador

Places
 Alparslan, Dinar, a village in the district of Dinar, Afyonkarahisar Province, Turkey
 Alparslan, Kastamonu, a village in the district of Kastamonu, Kastamonu Province, Turkey

See also
 Alpaslan, alternate spelling

Turkish masculine given names